Mildred is a unincorporated community in Allen County, Kansas, United States.  As of the 2020 census, the population of the community and nearby areas was 25.

History
Mildred was founded in 1907 by Sam Dermott for the Great Western Cement Company. The community was named for the daughter of J. W. Wagner a local industrialist, and the president of the cement company.  For much of the twentieth century, the community was served by the Missouri–Kansas–Texas Railroad, which maintained a passenger depot in the community, as well as spur lines that served the cement plant and the grain elevator. Cement was shipped all over the world, and cement from the plant was used to construct the Liberty Memorial and World War I museum in Kansas City, Missouri. At its peak the community had a population of approximately 2,000 and the cement plant employed 375, but the community lost most of its population when the plant closed. Mildred High School closed after the 1944 school year.  It was a city until it later disincorporated.

Geography
Mildred is located at  (38.022777, -95.173512).

Demographics

For statistical purposes, the United States Census Bureau has defined Mildred as a census-designated place (CDP).

2010 census
As of the census of 2010, there were 28 people, 14 households, and 6 families residing in the community. The racial makeup of the community was 82.1% White, 10.7% African American, and 7.1% Native American. Hispanic or Latino of any race were 7.1% of the population.

There were 14 households, of which 28.6% had children under the age of 18 living with them, 35.7% were married couples living together, 7.1% had a male householder with no wife present, and 57.1% were non-families. 57.1% of all households were made up of individuals, and 21.4% had someone living alone who was 65 years of age or older. The average household size was 2.00 and the average family size was 3.33.

The median age in the community was 46 years. 25% of residents were under the age of 18; 3.4% were between the ages of 18 and 24; 14.3% were from 25 to 44; 39.3% were from 45 to 64; and 17.9% were 65 years of age or older. The gender makeup of the community was 57.1% male and 42.9% female.

2000 census
As of the census of 2000, there were 36 people, 19 households, and 9 families residing in the community. The racial makeup of the community was 94.44% White, and 5.56% from two or more races.

There were 19 households, out of which 21.1% had children under the age of 18 living with them, 26.3% were married couples living together, 10.5% had a female householder with no husband present, and 52.6% were non-families. 52.6% of all households were made up of individuals, and 15.8% had someone living alone who was 65 years of age or older. The average household size was 1.89 and the average family size was 2.89.

In the community, the population was spread out, with 22.2% under the age of 18, 8.3% from 18 to 24, 27.8% from 25 to 44, 25.0% from 45 to 64, and 16.7% who were 65 years of age or older. The median age was 40 years. For every 100 females, there were 111.8 males. For every 100 females age 18 and over, there were 115.4 males.

The median income for a household in the community was $21,250, and the median income for a family was $14,167. Males had a median income of $20,625 versus $11,250 for females. The per capita income for the community was $8,372. There were 16.7% of families and 15.6% of the population living below the poverty line, including 18.2% of under eighteens and none of those over 64.

References

Further reading

External links
 USD 256, local school district
 Mildred community map, KDOT

Unincorporated communities in Allen County, Kansas
Unincorporated communities in Kansas
1907 establishments in Kansas